Venecija ('Venice') is a village in Jonava district municipality, in Kaunas County, in central Lithuania. According to the 2011 census, the village had a population of 6 people. It is located on a bank of Neris. Connected to road KK143 (Jonava - Elektrėnai)

Demography

References

Villages in Jonava District Municipality